Bream Creek is a rural locality in the local government area (LGA) of Sorell in the South-east LGA region of Tasmania. The 2016 census has a population of 124 for the state suburb of Bream Creek.

History 
Bream Creek was gazetted as a locality in 1968.

Geography
The waters of the Tasman Sea form most of the eastern boundary.

Road infrastructure 
Route C337 (Marion Bay Road) enters from the south-west and runs through to the south-east, where it exits. Route C336 (Bream Creek Road) starts at an intersection with Route C337 and runs north-east through the south-west of the locality before turning west and exiting.

Bream Creek Show
Bream Creek is best known for the Bream Creek Show, held since 1886. The show is famous for its giant pumpkin competition.

References

Towns in Tasmania
Localities of Sorell Council